John Douglas Pedersen (May 21, 1881 – May 23, 1951) was a prolific arms designer who worked for Remington Arms, and later for the United States Government. Famed gun designer John Moses Browning told Maj. Gen. Julian S. Hatcher of U.S. Army Ordnance that Pedersen "was the greatest gun designer in the world".

Early career
Pedersen is best known for the 1918 Pedersen device that converted a standard
military Springfield 1903 rifle to a
semi-automatic, pistol-caliber firearm.

He designed several successful sporting guns for Remington, including the novel
Model 51 pistol, the Model 10
pump-action shotgun and the Models 12, 14, and 25
pump-action rifles. He collaborated with John Browning to design the
Model 17 pump-action shotgun.  The Model 17 was a trim,
20-gauge shotgun that was later redesigned and made in three highly successful
forms: the Remington Model 31, Browning BPS, and
the Ithaca 37.

Pedersen designed two well received U.S. military firearms from the 20th century.  His .45 caliber automatic pistol, based on the same design as the Model 51, was accepted by the Navy Board for production, but the First World War intervened and Remington tooled to produce the M1911 instead.  He also designed a competing design to the M1 Garand rifle.  His design utilized a toggle-lock and patented waxed cartridges.  The Garand was selected instead. His "Pedersen rifle" was also trial tested by the British and Japanese between World War I and World War II, but it was not adopted. The ammunition he developed, the .276 Pedersen (7×51mm) waxed round was an experimental 7 mm cartridge developed for the U.S. Army and used in the Pedersen rifle.

Pedersen was issued 69 patents listing his home as Wyoming, and others listing Colorado and New York State.

World War II

During the early days of America's involvement in World War II, Pedersen formed a company with the Irwin family, who owned successful furniture
manufacturing concerns in Grand Rapids, Michigan. The Irwin-Pedersen Arms Company in that city was capitalized for $1,000,000.00, by the brothers Robert and Earl Irwin. Primarily through Pedersen's contacts in the Ordnance Department, the Irwin-Pedersen Arms Company received a contract to manufacture over 100,000 M1 Carbines to be produced at the rate of 1,000 per day after the Grand Rapids factory was tooled up and in full production.

Unfortunately, due to faulty management and a host of other difficulties, the company failed to achieve mass production and produced slightly over 3,500 M1 Carbines. None of these carbines met Ordnance Department standards and thus none were accepted for the military. In March 1943, the Ordnance Department cancelled the contract it had with the Irwin-Pedersen Arms Company. The Irwin-Pedersen's production facilities were taken over by another contractor, Saginaw Steering Gear Division of General Motors, on April 1, 1943. Today, Irwin-Pedersen M-1 Carbines are among the rarest versions of the M1 Carbine and as such, I-P Carbines usually command premium prices in collector's circles.

Legacy

Pedersen's sporting designs for Remington are highly regarded today and prized by shooters and collectors alike.

Many of Pedersen's U.S. military efforts were stymied by fate. Although the Navy recommended adoption of his .45 pistol design, the outbreak of World War I led to the design being shelved in favor of the M1911 pistol already in production for the Army. His most famous invention, the Pedersen Device, never had a chance to significantly affect the battles on the Western Front during World War I: the war ended before it could be manufactured in quantity and sent to France to equip the American Army (only 65,000 were produced out of planned production of 500,000). In the 1920s U.S. Army Ordnance selected his .276 Pedersen cartridge to replace the .30-06 in the infantry rifle and tested Pedersen's unique toggle-linked semi-automatic rifle in competitions at Aberdeen Proving Ground. The Pedersen rifle lost out to the rifle designed by John C. Garand. General MacArthur later vetoed the adoption of .276 Pedersen as the new infantry cartridge. General George S. Patton owned a Remington Model 51 and was thought to favor the weapon and is seen in many photos of the era wearing it as his personal sidearm. During World War II, John Pedersen's attempts through the Irwin-Pedersen Arms Company to mass-produce M1 Carbines for the U.S. military failed.

Personal life and family

Pedersen was born in Grand Island, Nebraska, the third of four children of Danish immigrants John H. and Matilda Christine Pedersen. The Pedersen family were ranchers and lived in several western states; they had a family ranch near Jackson Hole, Wyoming, where John Douglas lived after his parents died. Pedersen's education is unknown, according to family records, but it is known he traveled extensively.

On March 28, 1921 Pedersen married Reata Canady in Provo, Utah.  Canady was born in Greenville, Texas, and her father, a Scot named Loren Canady, was a railroad engineer sent to China, where he worked building a railroad. Canady accompanied him while her mother remained in the San Francisco Bay area. One day he went "down the line" to deliver a payroll to a railroad crew, and was never heard from again, leaving his now-semi-orphaned daughter to make her way home. She became a violinist protégé of Sir Thomas Lipton, who helped her attend nursing school and becoming an RN at Victoria Hospital, London. According to family legend, Reata was a nurse during World War I, working in a field hospital inside a bombed-out church in Belgium when a German shell hit. She was assisting in a surgery on a wounded soldier, and threw herself over him to keep debris out of his wounds. According to the story, they had to be pulled from the rubble, the soldier survived, and Reata received a decoration from the British government. This event brought her to the attention of an American magazine illustrator, possibly P.G. Morgan, who did 100 oil paintings for the Red Cross of her as a nurse, at night in a field hospital, using a small flashlight to read a patient's thermometer.  The painting was supposedly made into the cover illustration of one of the era's magazines. Though there is no documentation known to exist of this tale so far, the actual oil painting does exist, and currently has a place of honor in her granddaughter's home in Waldorf, Maryland. At some point during the war Reata produced short stories and magazine articles under the pen name Reata Van Houten; this much is documented. Her stories include Honor Among Thieves, All-Story Weekly (1917); Fiddler Joe, All-Story Weekly (1919); The Seven Sleeper, All-Story Weekly (1919); and Comrades of the Trail, and Munsey’s (1927). During the 1930s, she wrote articles for Field & Stream and similar magazines on topics like fly fishing. She also became a radio personality, and had her own show on an NBC affiliate, where she was known as "The Hostess of the Air."

The Pedersens had two children, Eric and Kristi-Ray. They traveled widely, he usually on business related to his gun designing, although their "base" was the family ranch in Jackson Hole. In the early 1920s, when Eric was about 4 and Kristi-Ray was about 3, they moved to England for several years, while John Douglas did some work for the Vickers company. Prior to her retirement, Reata worked as a nurse at a Goodwill Industries facility in San Diego. At some unknown point, they were divorced.

At the time of his death at age 70, Pedersen lived in Blandford, Massachusetts, a suburb of Springfield, home of the Springfield Armory and the Springfield rifle. It is not known if his residence there had any connection to the armory. Typically, though, Pedersen was traveling when he died, of a coronary, while in Cottonwood, Yavapai County, Arizona, near Prescott, where the Pedersens had lived for a time earlier in their lives. Reata Pedersen died in 1969 in San Diego, age 85. In 1946 Pedersen married Christine J. Loomis Bond, a widow, who was superintendent of nursing at a hospital where Pedersen may have been a patient receiving treatment for tuberculosis. At the time of his marriage, he was 65; his new wife was 33 years old. The marriage took place in Concord, New Hampshire.

At the start of the Korean War, his son Eric Pedersen joined the United States Marine Corps and served as a lieutenant in combat in Korea. He is memorialized in the book Reckless: Pride of the Marines.  Lt. Pedersen led a recoilless rifle platoon and at his own expense purchased a racehorse for use as an ammunition carrier. The horse became famous in the 1st Marine Division. Reckless became the first horse to participate in a Marine amphibious landing, was promoted through the ranks from private to corporal to sergeant, and at the war's end was shipped to Camp Pendleton, California, where she lived out her retirement as a beloved mascot.

References
Most of the information about the Irwin-Pedersen Arms Company came from Larry L. Ruth's book: "War Baby! The U.S. Caliber .30 Carbine," Collector Grade Publications, Cobourg, Ontario, Canada 2001. 

Information concerning Pedersen family history comes from family records, photographs, the oil painting, genealogical research, death certificates, and other documentation in the possession of the Pedersens' granddaughter.

External links

68 Patents as John D. Pedersen
One Patent as John Douglas Pedersen
List of Reata Van Houten's short stories
Full text of "Reckless: Pride of the Marines, online

American inventors
Weapon designers
Firearm designers
American people of Danish descent
1881 births
1951 deaths
People from Blandford, Massachusetts
People from Grand Island, Nebraska